Margaret de Quincy may refer to:
 Margaret de Quincy, Countess of Lincoln (c.1206–1266); daughter of Robert de Quincy and Hawise of Chester, Countess of Lincoln
 Margaret de Quincy, Countess of Derby (1218–1280); daughter of Roger de Quincy, 2nd Earl of Winchester